Chilubi is a constituency of the National Assembly of Zambia. It covers a rural area (Chilubi) on the eastern shore of Lake Bangweulu in Chilubi District of Northern Province.

List of MPs

References

Constituencies of the National Assembly of Zambia
1973 establishments in Zambia
Constituencies established in 1973